A list of works by the composer Robert Moevs.

Sources:

Compositions

Orchestral works
 Passacaglia (1941)
 Endymion (1948)
 Introduction and Fugue (1949)
 Overture (1950)
 Fourteen Variations (1952)
 Three Symphonic Pieces (1954–55)
 Concerto Grosso, piano, percussion, and orchestra (1960)
 Main-Travelled Roads (1973)
 Prometheus (Music for Small Orchestra, I) (1980)
 Pandora (Music for Small Orchestra, II) (1983)
 Symphonic Piece No. 5 (1984)
 Symphonic Piece No. 6 (1986)

Chamber works
 Spring, four violins and trumpets (1950)
 Duo for oboe and English horn (1953)
 String Quartet No. 1 (1957)
 Variazioni sopra una melodia, viola and cello (1961)
 In Festivitate, wind instruments and percussion (1962)
 Musica da camera I, chamber ensemble (1965)
 Fanfara canonica, six herald trumpets (1966)
 Musica da camera II, chamber ensemble (1972)
 Trio, violin, cello, piano (1980)
 Three Pieces, violin and piano (1982)
 Woodwind Quintet, flute, oboe, clarinet, bassoon, horn (1987)
 Dark Litany, wind ensemble (1988)
 String Quartet No. 2 (1989)
 Musica da Camera III: Daphne, chamber ensemble (1992)
 String Quartet No. 3 (1996)
 Musica da Camera IV, chamber ensemble (1997)
 Musica da Camera V, chamber ensemble (2000)

Works for solo instruments
 Pan, solo flute (1951)
 The Past Revisited, solo violin (1956)
 Heptachron, solo cello (1969)
 B-A-C-H, Es ist genug, solo organ (1970)
 Crystals, solo flute (1979)
 Postlude, solo organ (1980)
 Saraband, solo harpsichord (1986)
 Echo, solo guitar (1994)

Piano works
 Sonatina (1946–1947)
 Sonata (1950)
 Fantasia sopra un motivo (1951)
 Phoenix (1971)
 Ludi Praeteriti: Games of the Past, two pianos (1976)
 Una collana musicale (1977)
 Triad, two pianos (1988)
 Pentachronon (1994)
 Rondo (1996)

Cantatas
 Cantata Sacra, baritone solo, men's chorus, flute, 4 trombones, timpani (1952)
 Attis, tenor solo, mixed chorus, percussion, and orchestra (1958)
 Ode to an Olympic Hero, voice and orchestra (1963)
 Attis, Part II (1963)
 The Aulos Player, soprano solo, 2 choruses, 2 organs (1975)

Songs
 Youthful Song, voice and piano (1940)
 Villanelle, voice and piano (1950)
 Time, mezzo soprano and piano (1969)
 Epigram, voice and piano (1978)
 Two Songs from Sappho, voice and piano (1995)
 Six Songs on Poems by Ungaretti, voice and piano (1995)
 The Ballad of Angel Lynn, voice and piano (1998)

Choral works
 Great Nations of This Earth, women's chorus a cappella (1942)
 The Bacchantes, mixed chorus a cappella (1947)
 Itaque Ut, chorus a cappella (1959)
 Et Nunc, Reges, women's chorus, flute, clarinet, bass clarinet (1963)
 Et Occidentem Illustra, chorus and orchestra (1964)
 Ave Maria, a cappella chorus (1966)
 Alleluia for Michaelmas, organ and congregation (1967)
 A Brief Mass, chorus, organ, vibraphone, guitar, double bass (1968)

Other
 Piece for Synket, electronic music (1969)
 Paths and Ways, saxophone and dancer (1970)
 Conun*drum, percussion quintet (1995)

References

Moevs, Robert, compositions by